The Swimming competition at the 3rd Pan American Games was held in Chicago, United States during the Games' run in 1959. It consisted of 16 long course (50 m) events: 8 for males and 8 for females.

In these Games, the U.S. swept all gold medals in swimming.

A world record was broken by the U.S. in the women's  medley relay, with a time of 4:44.6.

Results

Men

Women

Medal table

References